Crowned may refer to:

 Senses of "to crown":
 Having been the object of a coronation
 Crowning stage of childbirth
 Titled works:
 Crowned (web series), an American comedy web series
 Crowned: The Mother of All Pageants, an American TV series

See also
 Crown (disambiguation)